Hamburg Altona is a 1989 Yugoslav anthology film directed by Mladen Mitrović, Vedran Mihletić and Dragutin Krencer.

Plot 
Three inmates, Čombe (Željko Vukmirica), Menso (Mirsad Zulić) and Bogart (Filip Šovagović), escape from prison in order to go to Hamburg, their dream destination. Before they temporarily split and go to their respective towns, they agree to meet in Zagreb and board the train to Hamburg together.

From that point on, the film develops into three separate plots: in Rijeka, Čombe attempts to get even with Mrva, his former partner in crime who betrayed him, Menso is spending time with his wife and children in a Bosnian village, while Bogart starts a romance with a handsome teacher in the outskirts of Belgrade.

Upon learning from the newspapers that his two comrades have been arrested, Bogart makes a last-minute change in his plan...

Reception 
Hamburg Altona, the feature film debut for the three young directors, received mixed reviews from the critics. They criticized the screenplay and direction for being somewhat clichéd and predictable, but found the mix of crime film and melodrama interesting.

Sources 
 Hamburg Altona at hrfilm.hr

External links 
 

1989 films
Croatian anthology films
Croatian-language films
Films set in Hamburg
Croatian drama films
1989 drama films
Yugoslav drama films
Films set in Yugoslavia
Films set in Zagreb
Films set in Belgrade
Films shot in Belgrade